Nearchus (Nearchos) was a tyrant of the ancient Greek city of Elea in Magna Graecia, who ruled in the 5th century BC. He is only known from an anecdote in connection with the philosopher Zeno of Elea, whom Nearchus tortured and, according to some sources, executed for having conspired against Nearchus's regime.

References

Ancient Greek tyrants
5th-century BC Greek people
Year of birth unknown
Lucanian Greeks